Hamra al-Asad is a location in Saudi Arabia about eight miles from Medina. The Invasion of Hamra al-Asad took place here on the orders of Muhammad.

See also
List of battles of Muhammad

References

Cities in Saudi Arabia
Quran